Francisca is a throwing axe used as a weapon during the Early Middle Ages by the Franks.

Francisca may also refer to:
 Francisca (given name), a feminine given name
 Francisca (film), a 1981 film directed by Manoel de Oliveira
 Catocala francisca, a moth species found in California
 Tinta Francisca, a red wine grape found primarily in the Douro DOC and is sometimes used in Port wine production
 Villa Francisca, a sector in the city of Santo Domingo in the Distrito Nacional of the Dominican Republic
 Francisca Club, a women's only social club in San Francisco
 Francisca, one of the Three Mage-Sisters from Kirby Star Allies

See also

Francisco
Francesca